Willard Clark "Mike" Freeman (February 23, 1929 - April 17, 2013) was an American Thoroughbred horse racing steeplechase jockey and very successful trainer in flat racing. He is best remembered as the trainer of Anne Stone's Shuvee, a two-time National Champion, a Filly Triple Crown winner and a U.S. Racing Hall of Fame inductee.  

Widely known by the nickname Mike, racing in North America he won a number of the top races including the Jockey Club Gold Cup in 1970 and 1971 with Shuvee which marked the first time a filly had ever won the race in its fifty-three year history. Among his other top wins, Freeman won the prestigious 1989 Rothmans International in 1989 and the Washington, D.C. International Stakes in 1993.
 

At the time of his passing, Willard Freeman and his wife Iris had, for many years, owned Chime Bell Farm in Aiken, South Carolina.

References

	

1929 births
2013 deaths
American jockeys
American horse trainers
People from Providence, Rhode Island
Sportspeople from Aiken, South Carolina